This list of listed buildings in Vesterbro/Kongens Enghave comprises listed buildings and structures in the Vesterbro/Kongens Enghave district of Copenhagen, Denmark.

List

References

Listed buildings and structures in Copenhagen